The 1892 Case football team was an American football team that represented the Case School of Applied Science in Cleveland, Ohio, now a part of Case Western Reserve University. Playing as an independent during the 1892 college football season, the team compiled a 3–0 record.

Schedule

References

Case
Case Western Reserve Spartans football seasons
College football undefeated seasons
Case football